The  is a Japanese international school located in Halstenbek, Schleswig-Holstein, Germany, within the Hamburg Metropolitan Region.

History
The day school was founded on 23 April 1981, with the first campus at Osdorfer Landstraße 390/392 in Hamburg.

The current building in Halstenbek, designed by Architekten R+K, was completed in 1994. The school building has  of space and includes athletic facilities. As of 2013 the school had 110 students and 13 teachers; the Japanese government sends the teachers to Germany.

A couple, Jürgen and Christa Heidorn, gave an orchard to the Japanese school.

The Britannica International School is being built on the site of the Japanese school.

The Japanisches Institut Hamburg (ハンブルグ補習授業校 Hanburugu Hoshū Jugyō Kō), a Japanese weekend educational programme, holds its classes in the Hamburg Japanese school building. It has done so since 1994.

School culture
 created the lyrics and melody of the school song.

See also
 Japanese people in Germany
German international schools in Japan:
German School Tokyo Yokohama - in Yokohama, Japan
Deutsche Schule Kobe/European School

References

Further reading
  "Japanische Schule in Halstenbek: Große Sorge nach Erdbeben" (Archive). Die Welt. 12 March 2011.
  "Japanische Schule in Halstenbek voller Sorge" (Archive). Hamburger Abendblatt. 11 March 2011.
 山路 千華. "海外子女教育における保育研究についての一考察 : ハンブルグ日本人学校幼稚部での実践から." こども教育研究所紀要 (6・7), 25–42, 2011. Tokyo Bunka Junior College こども教育研究所. See info page at CiNii.
 関口 純司 (前ハンブルグ日本人学校:奈良県香; 芝市立下田小学校). "ハンブルグ日本人学校における学校運営 : 「夢のたまご」を育む (第7章 学校経営)." 在外教育施設における指導実践記録 32, 135–138, 2009-10-12. Tokyo Gakugei University. See info page at CiNii

External links

 Japanese School in Hamburg  with info in English and German
 
  Japanische schule - City of Halstenbek

Education in Hamburg
Schools in Schleswig-Holstein
Hamburg
Educational institutions established in 1981
Japanese international schools in Germany
1981 establishments in West Germany